After Darkness may refer to:

 After Darkness (1985 film), a Swiss horror film
 After Darkness (2019 film), an American-Mexican science fiction film
 After Darkness (novel), a 2014 novel by Christine Piper

See also
 After the Darkness (disambiguation)